Junius Kellogg (March 16, 1927 – September 16, 1998) was an American basketball player, coach, and civil servant. He was the first African-American to play basketball for Manhattan College. While playing for the Jaspers, Kellogg became known for his role in helping to expose the CCNY point-shaving scandal of 1950–51.

College career

In 1951, Kellogg, a standout 6'8" center, was offered a $1,000 bribe to shave points, before a game against DePaul. Although he was working for minimum wage at a frozen custard shop near campus, he refused to take it, reporting the solicitation to his coach, Ken Norton. Norton sent him to the district attorney, Frank Hogan. To get evidence about the corruption, he wore a wire when he was again approached in a nearby bar. His whistle blowing touched off the largest college betting scandal in American history. Ultimately, the investigation involved thirty-two players from seven colleges and encompassed 86 games between 1947 and 1950, including three stars from the 1950 City College of New York team. CCNY had won both the National Invitation Tournament and the NCAA Division I men's basketball tournament, in 1950, the only time that has ever been accomplished.

Car accident and later life

Kellogg left college for a stint in the Army; he then returned to Manhattan College, where he doubled up on courses.  He graduated in 1953 and began playing for the Harlem Globetrotters.  In 1954, he sustained a cervical spinal cord injury in an automobile accident and was paralyzed.  Three fellow Globetrotters were unscathed during the accident.

Kellogg received treatment at the Veterans Administration Hospital in the Bronx, New York City, New York.  He became an ardent supporter of wheelchair athletics.  He coached the Pan Am Jets as well as the Brooklyn Whirlaways.  He was head coach of the USA Stoke Mandeville Games team as well as the head coach of the 1964 US Paralympic Basketball Team where the USA team won the gold medal.  He was inducted into the National Wheelchair Basketball Association's hall of fame in 1981. In 2000, Kellogg was inducted into the Virginia Sports Hall of Fame.

Kellogg served for many years on the board of directors of Eastern Paralyzed Veterans Association (later the United Spinal Association) and worked for New York City from 1966 until his death in 1998.  He served at the first deputy commissioner and director of strategic planning for the Community Development Agency.  He received an honorary Doctor of Laws degree from Manhattan College in 1997.

References

1927 births
1998 deaths
People with paraplegia
Manhattan Jaspers basketball players
Harlem Globetrotters players
United States Army soldiers
American men's basketball players